Nong (trad. 農 or 辳, simp. 农) is a Chinese surname meaning "farmer". It is romanized Nung in Wade–Giles or Cantonese romanization. According to a 2013 study, it was the 189th most common name in China; it was shared by 640,000 people, or 0.047% of the population, with the surname being most common in Guangxi. It is the 320th name in the Hundred Family Surnames poem.

Origins
Two origins are proposed:
In honour of Shennong (神農, "Divine Farmer"), mythological figure who brought agriculture and herbal medicine to China
From the ancient post of nongzheng (農正, "agriculture officer").

Notable people
Nong Qunhua (农群华), badminton player
Nong Rong (农融), diplomat

References

Individual Chinese surnames